Acceleration Team China is the Chinese team of Formula Acceleration 1, an international racing series. They are run by the Moma Motorsport team, a new team founded by Carlos Mollá and Dani Clos.

History

2014 season 
Drivers: Oliver Campos-Hull, Armando Parente

The team announced Spanish driver Oliver Campos-Hull as their driver for the inaugural Formula Acceleration 1 round in Portimao. He moved to the Spanish team for the 2nd round in Navarra and was replaced by Portuguese driver Armando Parente.

Drivers

Complete Formula Acceleration 1 Results

References 

China
National sports teams of China
Chinese auto racing teams